Murray Islands are an island group in the Torres Strait, Queensland, Australia. The group consists of Murray Island (known traditionally as Mer Island), Daua Island and Waua Islet. The islands are within the Torres Strait Island Region local government area.

History 
The Island group was named in August 1791 by Captain Edward Edwards, commander of the Royal Navy vessel .

See also
 List of Torres Strait Islands

References 

Torres Strait Islands
Torres Strait Island Region